This is a list of Spanish television related events from 2019.

Events
 1 October -  Following a Supreme Court of Spain decision Telecinco ceases broadcasting the quiz show Pasapalabra  after a lawesuit by the rights owner ITV British Channel.
 24 November - After 13 years Spain returns to the Junior Eurovision Song Contest 2019 and ranks 3th.
 4 December - Begoña Alegría resigns from Heaf of News Department in Televisión Española omo directora de informativos de TVE.

Debuts

Television shows

Ending this year

Changes of network affiliation

Deaths
 6 January - Santiago López Castillo, journalist, 74.
 19 January - Lolo Rico, director and writer, 84.
 3 March - Martí Galindo, actor, 81.
 30 March - Paloma Cela, actress, 76.
 8 April - Héctor del Mar, host, 76.
 24 April - Conrado San Martín, actor, 98.
 18 May - Analía Gadé, actress, 87.
 22 May - Eduardo Punset, director, writer and host, 82.
 June - José María Quero, director, 90.
 7 June - Narciso Ibáñez Serrador, director and writer, 83.
 4 July 
 Arturo Fernández, actor, 90.
 Eduardo Fajardo, actor, 94.
 24 July - Alejandro Millán, puppeteer.
 28 July - Eduardo Gómez, actor, 68.
 30 July - Mari Carmen Izquierdo, journalist deportiva, 69.
 7 October - Pepe Oneto, journalist and pundit, 77.
 2 November - Nicolás Dueñas, actor, 77.
 23 November - Asunción Balaguer, actress, 94.
 4 December
 Claudio Rodríguez, 86, voice actor.
 Manuel Tejada, actor, 79.
 Azucena Hernández, actress, 59.

See also
2019 in Spain

References